Bedfont Sports Football Club is a football club based in Bedfont, Greater London, England.

History
The club was established in 2002 as a Saturday team for Bedfont Sunday, a Sunday league team, and shortly afterwards absorbed the Bedfont Eagles youth club. In 2003 they joined Division One of the Hounslow and District League, going on to win it at the first attempt.

In 2004 Bedfont joined Division One of the Middlesex County League, and after finishing as runners-up in their first season, were promoted to the Premier Division. In 2006–07 and 2007–08 they won the league's Open Cup, whilst the 2008–09 season saw them win the Middlesex Premier Cup and finish third in the Premier Division, after which they moved up to Division One of the Combined Counties League. In 2011–12 they finished as runners-up in Division One, earning promotion to the Premier Division.

The 2017–18 season saw Bedfont finish as runners-up in the Premier Division, earning promotion to the South Central Division of the Isthmian League.

Ground

The club play at the Bedfont Recreation Ground on Hatton Road in Bedfont. It has a capacity of 3,000, of which 200 is covered. In 2018, the Bedfont Recreation Ground hosted a number of games in the CONIFA World Cup.

Honours
Middlesex County League
Open Cup winners 2006–07, 2007–08
Hounslow and District League
Division One champions 2003–04
Middlesex Premier Cup
Winners 2009–10

Records
Best FA Cup performance: Fourth qualifying round, 2021–22
Best FA Vase performance: Third round, 2016–17

See also
Bedfont Sports F.C. players

References

External links
Official website

Football clubs in England
Football clubs in London
Association football clubs established in 2002
2002 establishments in England
Middlesex County Football League
Combined Counties Football League
Isthmian League
Sport in the London Borough of Hounslow